This is a list of Congolese singers.

A 

 Cor Akim

B 
 Céline Banza
 Patsha Bay
 M'bilia Bel
 Gibson Butukondolo

C 
 Cindy Le Coeur

D

E 
Lucie Eyenga

K 

 Kanda Bongo Man
Mike Kalambay
 Lokua Kanza
 Kaysha
 Josky Kiambukuta
 Wendo Kolosoy

L 
 Laurette la Perle
 N'Yoka Longo
 Awilo Longomba
 Vicky Longomba
 Malage de Lugendo

M 
M'Pongo Love
Nathalie Makoma
Abeti Masikini
Fabrice Mbuyulu
Marie Misamu
 Madilu System
 Réjane Magloire
Sam Mangwana
 Jessy Matador
Moise Mbiye
 Mohombi
 Bouro Mpela
Tshala Muana
Dena Mwana

N 

 Nyboma Mwan'dido (Nyboma)

O 

 Koffi Olomide
 Bimi Ombale
 Jimmy Omonga

R 

 Tabu Ley Rochereau

T 

 Alicios Theluji

W 

 Papa Wemba
 Werrason

Y 

 Dindo Yogo

Lists of singers by nationality
 
Singers